Elamkulam is an area in Kadavanthra  region in the city of Kochi, state of Kerala, India. Elamkulam falls under Kadavanthra Post Office and Kadavanthra Janamythri Police station.
Elamkulam is well facilitated with Metro railway station which works as an extension counter to Kadavanthra metro station to cater to passengers who want to shop at branded outlets like MAX,Trends etc. Elamkulam metro station also privileges direct entry to Radisson Blu Kochi.

Location
The buildings and offices in Kadavanthra expanded to the spaces of this place which is next bus stop after Kadavanthra towards Vyttila direction. Elamkulam boasts several small and large churches, the biggest of which is the Little Flower Church located at the Sahodaran Ayyapan Road (S.A. Road). The road to the north from the Elamkulam bus stop leads to Sewage Treatment Plant. The road is hence named S.T.P. road and it is also known as the Fatima Church road.  The road towards south is the Chilavanoor road.

Landmarks
The S.T.P. road leads to Chettichira junction in Subhash Chandra Bose road. It was the old way to get to Kadavanthra before the Kaloor-Kadavanthra Road came to existence and its full functionality. The Elamkulam junction also houses the Navy quarters and leads to the backwaters of Chilavanoor where many flats are on the rise.
Elamkulam comes under the Kadavanthra P.O. The Elamkulam Village office is located opposite to the Rajiv Gandhi Indoor Stadium known previously as Regional Sports Centre, Kochi at Kadavanthra. The Elamkulam village office where the land taxes and residential issues and taxes are collected is one of the three Village offices in the Cochin Corporation. Elamkulam region expands from the bridge over the erstwhile Thripunithura lagoon, which is at present just a canal, to the Elamkulam junction. Alingal residence association is situated here.

Educational Institutions
Traum Academy for German & Foreign language
Sheela tuition centre

Colonies
Many residential colonies under the Elamkulam region include:
Kumaranasan nagar
Vrindavanam Colony
Nethaji Nagar
Jawahar Nagar
Giri Nagar
Bose Nagar
Vinobha Nagar
Tagore Nagar

Places of worship
Elamkulam has Hindu temples such as:
The Elamkulam Bhagavathy Temple in Kaloor-Kadavanthra Road aka Kavalakkal 
Devi Te
Alingal sreedurga devi temple 
Narasimhamurty Temple
Ponnothukaavu Bhagavathy Temple in Chilavannoor Road

Elamkulam has Christian Churches such as:
Fatima Church (first church in Elamkulam)
Little Flower Church in Sahodaran Ayyappan Road
St Mary's Soonoro Patriarchal Cathedral
Jerusalem Mar Thoma Church
St. Gregorios Orthodox Chapel
Emmanuel Baptist Church
CSI Christ Church
New Life Fellowship( Malayalam, Hindi, Odiya, English, Tamil)

Facilities at the junction
Petrol Pump HPCL
Airtel Showroom
SBI ATM

References

https://www.aninews.in/news/national/general-news/14-year-old-makes-short-film-on-the-roads-at-night-in-kochi-amid-lockdown20200615162628/

Neighbourhoods in Kochi